The Pskov Constituency (No. 148) is a Russian legislative constituency covering the entirety of Pskov Oblast.

Members elected

Election results

1993

|-
! colspan=2 style="background-color:#E9E9E9;text-align:left;vertical-align:top;" |Candidate
! style="background-color:#E9E9E9;text-align:left;vertical-align:top;" |Party
! style="background-color:#E9E9E9;text-align:right;" |Votes
! style="background-color:#E9E9E9;text-align:right;" |%
|-
|style="background-color:"|
|align=left|Yevgeny Mikhaylov
|align=left|Liberal Democratic Party
|
|29.89%
|-
|style="background-color:"|
|align=left|Aleksandr Malyshev
|align=left|Agrarian Party
| -
|22.70%
|-
| colspan="5" style="background-color:#E9E9E9;"|
|- style="font-weight:bold"
| colspan="3" style="text-align:left;" | Total
| 
| 100%
|-
| colspan="5" style="background-color:#E9E9E9;"|
|- style="font-weight:bold"
| colspan="4" |Source:
|
|}

1995

|-
! colspan=2 style="background-color:#E9E9E9;text-align:left;vertical-align:top;" |Candidate
! style="background-color:#E9E9E9;text-align:left;vertical-align:top;" |Party
! style="background-color:#E9E9E9;text-align:right;" |Votes
! style="background-color:#E9E9E9;text-align:right;" |%
|-
|style="background-color:"|
|align=left|Aleksandr Nevzorov
|align=left|Independent
|
|27.87%
|-
|style="background-color:"|
|align=left|Gennady Bubnov
|align=left|Independent
|
|17.04%
|-
|style="background-color:"|
|align=left|Yevgeny Mikhaylov (incumbent)
|align=left|Liberal Democratic Party
|
|13.97%
|-
|style="background-color:#23238E"|
|align=left|Viktor Vasenkin
|align=left|Our Home – Russia
|
|9.58%
|-
|style="background-color:"|
|align=left|Ivan Komar
|align=left|Independent
|
|7.41%
|-
|style="background-color:"|
|align=left|Zinaida Kazakova
|align=left|Power to the People!
|
|4.46%
|-
|style="background-color:#3A46CE"|
|align=left|Yevgeny Malinin
|align=left|Democratic Choice of Russia – United Democrats
|
|3.69%
|-
|style="background-color:#F5A222"|
|align=left|Lyudmila Kovaleva
|align=left|Interethnic Union
|
|3.00%
|-
|style="background-color:"|
|align=left|Viktor Balynsky
|align=left|Independent
|
|2.55%
|-
|style="background-color:"|
|align=left|Nikolay Panov
|align=left|Independent
|
|2.11%
|-
|style="background-color:#0D0900"|
|align=left|Gennady Vladimirov
|align=left|People's Union
|
|1.42%
|-
|style="background-color:#000000"|
|colspan=2 |against all
|
|5.64%
|-
| colspan="5" style="background-color:#E9E9E9;"|
|- style="font-weight:bold"
| colspan="3" style="text-align:left;" | Total
| 
| 100%
|-
| colspan="5" style="background-color:#E9E9E9;"|
|- style="font-weight:bold"
| colspan="4" |Source:
|
|}

1999

|-
! colspan=2 style="background-color:#E9E9E9;text-align:left;vertical-align:top;" |Candidate
! style="background-color:#E9E9E9;text-align:left;vertical-align:top;" |Party
! style="background-color:#E9E9E9;text-align:right;" |Votes
! style="background-color:#E9E9E9;text-align:right;" |%
|-
|style="background-color:"|
|align=left|Mikhail Kuznetsov
|align=left|Independent
|
|35.26%
|-
|style="background-color:"|
|align=left|Vladimir Nikitin
|align=left|Communist Party
|
|21.26%
|-
|style="background-color:"|
|align=left|Igor Savitsky
|align=left|Independent
|
|11.82%
|-
|style="background-color:"|
|align=left|Serafim Ivanov
|align=left|Independent
|
|6.04%
|-
|style="background-color:"|
|align=left|Vladislav Tumanov
|align=left|Independent
|
|5.53%
|-
|style="background-color:#084284"|
|align=left|Viktor Antipov
|align=left|Spiritual Heritage
|
|3.21%
|-
|style="background-color:"|
|align=left|Yevgeny Podkolzin
|align=left|Independent
|
|3.06%
|-
|style="background-color:"|
|align=left|Aleksandr Trusov
|align=left|Independent
|
|1.45%
|-
|style="background-color:#020266"|
|align=left|Yury Mironovich
|align=left|Russian Socialist Party
|
|0.82%
|-
|style="background-color:#000000"|
|colspan=2 |against all
|
|10.10%
|-
| colspan="5" style="background-color:#E9E9E9;"|
|- style="font-weight:bold"
| colspan="3" style="text-align:left;" | Total
| 
| 100%
|-
| colspan="5" style="background-color:#E9E9E9;"|
|- style="font-weight:bold"
| colspan="4" |Source:
|
|}

2003

|-
! colspan=2 style="background-color:#E9E9E9;text-align:left;vertical-align:top;" |Candidate
! style="background-color:#E9E9E9;text-align:left;vertical-align:top;" |Party
! style="background-color:#E9E9E9;text-align:right;" |Votes
! style="background-color:#E9E9E9;text-align:right;" |%
|-
|style="background-color:"|
|align=left|Aleksey Sigutkin
|align=left|United Russia
|
|27.15%
|-
|style="background-color:"|
|align=left|Mikhail Kuznetsov (incumbent)
|align=left|Independent
|
|21.25%
|-
|style="background-color:"|
|align=left|Vladimir Nikitin
|align=left|Communist Party
|
|15.65%
|-
|style="background-color:#00A1FF"|
|align=left|Mikhail Bryachak
|align=left|Party of Russia's Rebirth-Russian Party of Life
|
|12.37%
|-
|style="background-color:"|
|align=left|Viktor Mitropolsky
|align=left|Independent
|
|4.22%
|-
|style="background-color:#C21022"|
|align=left|Igor Smirnov
|align=left|Russian Pensioners' Party-Party of Social Justice
|
|2.89%
|-
|style="background-color:"|
|align=left|Vasily Tyomin
|align=left|Liberal Democratic Party
|
|2.49%
|-
|style="background-color:"|
|align=left|Lev Shlosberg
|align=left|Yabloko
|
|1.93%
|-
|style="background-color:"|
|align=left|Andrey Lisin
|align=left|Independent
|
|1.79%
|-
|style="background-color:"|
|align=left|Lyudmila Labunina
|align=left|Independent
|
|0.77%
|-
|style="background-color:#000000"|
|colspan=2 |against all
|
|8.32%
|-
| colspan="5" style="background-color:#E9E9E9;"|
|- style="font-weight:bold"
| colspan="3" style="text-align:left;" | Total
| 
| 100%
|-
| colspan="5" style="background-color:#E9E9E9;"|
|- style="font-weight:bold"
| colspan="4" |Source:
|
|}

2016

|-
! colspan=2 style="background-color:#E9E9E9;text-align:left;vertical-align:top;" |Candidate
! style="background-color:#E9E9E9;text-align:leftt;vertical-align:top;" |Party
! style="background-color:#E9E9E9;text-align:right;" |Votes
! style="background-color:#E9E9E9;text-align:right;" |%
|-
| style="background-color: " |
|align=left|
|align=left|United Russia
|94,372
|40.88%
|-
| style="background-color: " |
|align=left|Aleksandr Rogov
|align=left|Communist Party
|33,472
|14.50%
|-
| style="background-color: " |
|align=left|Oleg Bryachak
|align=left|A Just Russia
|28,819
|12.48%
|-
| style="background-color: " |
|align=left|Anton Minakov
|align=left|Liberal Democratic Party
|21,463
|9.30%
|-
| style="background-color: " |
|align=left|Lev Shlosberg
|align=left|Yabloko
|13,669
|5.92%
|-
| style="background-color: " |
|align=left|Vyacheslav Yevdokimenko
|align=left|Communists of Russia
|11,701
|5.07%
|-
| style="background-color: " |
|align=left|Mikhail Khoronen
|align=left|Patriots of Russia
|6,415
|2.78%
|-
| style="background-color: " |
|align=left|Konstantin Vilkov
|align=left|Rodina
|3,636
|1.57%
|-
| style="background-color: " |
|align=left|Anna Galkina
|align=left|Civic Platform
|2,886
|1.25%
|-
| style="background-color: " |
|align=left|Vasiliy Krasnov
|align=left|Party of Growth
|2,805
|1.22%
|-
| style="background-color: " |
|align=left|Remm Malyshkin
|align=left|The Greens
|2,015
|0.87%
|-
| style="background-color:#00A650" |
|align=left|Biysultan Khamzayev
|align=left|Civilian Power
|1,222
|0.53%
|-
| colspan="5" style="background-color:#E9E9E9;"|
|- style="font-weight:bold"
| colspan="3" style="text-align:left;" | Total
| 230,853
| 100%
|-
| colspan="5" style="background-color:#E9E9E9;"|
|- style="font-weight:bold"
| colspan="4" |Source:
|
|}

2021

|-
! colspan=2 style="background-color:#E9E9E9;text-align:left;vertical-align:top;" |Candidate
! style="background-color:#E9E9E9;text-align:left;vertical-align:top;" |Party
! style="background-color:#E9E9E9;text-align:right;" |Votes
! style="background-color:#E9E9E9;text-align:right;" |%
|-
|style="background-color: " |
|align=left| (incumbent)
|align=left|United Russia
|88,032
|38.68%
|-
|style="background-color: " |
|align=left|Dmitry Mikhaylov
|align=left|Communist Party
|27,880
|12.25%
|-
|style="background-color: " |
|align=left|Oleg Bryachak
|align=left|A Just Russia — For Truth
|27,430
|12.05%
|-
|style="background-color: " |
|align=left|Artur Gayduk
|align=left|Yabloko
|20,534
|9.02%
|-
|style="background: #E62020;"| 
|align=left|Vyacheslav Yevdokimenko
|align=left|Communists of Russia
|14,385
|6.32%
|-
|style="background-color: " |
|align=left|Anton Minakov
|align=left|Liberal Democratic Party
|11,618
|5.11%
|-
|style="background-color: " |
|align=left|Andrey Makovsky
|align=left|New People
|11,599
|5.10%
|-
|style="background-color: " |
|align=left|Mikhail Ivanov
|align=left|Party of Pensioners
|10,683
|5.69%
|-
|style="background:"| 
|align=left|Igor Romanov
|align=left|Party of Growth
|3,699
|1.63%
|-
|style="background-color: " |
|align=left|Mikhail Lebedik
|align=left|Rodina
|3,220
|1.41%
|-
| colspan="5" style="background-color:#E9E9E9;"|
|- style="font-weight:bold"
| colspan="3" style="text-align:left;" | Total
| 227,576
| 100%
|-
| colspan="5" style="background-color:#E9E9E9;"|
|- style="font-weight:bold"
| colspan="4" |Source:
|
|}

References

Notes

Russian legislative constituencies
Politics of Pskov Oblast